The Tur is a tributary of the river Tisza. Its sources are located in the Oaș Mountains in Romania. The Tur starts at the confluence of its headwaters, the Gorova and Turișor. It then flows through Satu Mare County in Romania. The main town on the Tur is Turulung. The Tur joins the Tisza river near Szatmárcseke in Hungary.

Tributaries
The following rivers are tributaries to the river Tur:

Left: Strâmba, Talna, Racta, Egherul Mare.
Right: Valea Rea, Turț.

References

Rivers of Romania
Rivers of Satu Mare County
International rivers of Europe
Hungary–Romania border
Romania–Ukraine border